Rasila is a surname. Notable people with the surname include:

Isaia Rasila (1969–2010), Fijian rugby union player
Jukka Rasila (born 1969), Finnish actor